Brattahlíð, often anglicised as Brattahlid, was Erik the Red's estate in the Eastern Settlement Viking colony he established in south-western Greenland toward the end of the 10th century. Erik and his descendants lived there until about the mid-15th century. The name Brattahlíð means "the steep slope". The estate, along with other archeological sites in southwestern Greenland, was inscribed on the UNESCO World Heritage List in 2017 as  Kujataa Greenland: Norse and Inuit Farming at the Edge of the Ice Cap.

Church 
At Brattahlíð stood probably the first European church in the Americas: Þjóðhildarkirkja (Thjodhild's church, actually a small chapel). A recent reconstruction of this chapel now stands at a distance from the actual site, along with a replica of a Norse longhouse.

At the site of the main church, built after the Norse were converted to Christianity, investigators have found melted fragments of bell-metal, and foundation stones of it and other buildings remained into the 20th century, as did the remnants of a possible forge. This church (not Thjodhild's chapel) measured 12.5 by 4.5 m. and had two entrances, with what was evidently a hearth in the middle. Apparently, fire destroyed it. The church, possibly a 14th-century structure, may have stood on the ruins of an earlier church. The churchyard has tombstones, with a cross cut on one of them. On another stand engraved the runes for "Ingibjørg's Grave". , stones clearly mark the church's outline, though people probably placed them there in recent years; visitors can also see the surrounding graveyard.

Farm 
One farm building nearby measured 53 by 14 m, with stone walls about 1.5 m thick; a turf outer bank provided further insulation. Inside, it had a flagstone floor.  Flat stones — or, in one case, the shoulder-blade of a whale — formed the stalls. Some of these buildings still stood in 1953, contemporaneous with the Bluie West One airfield at Narsarsuaq, but today they exist mostly as depressions in the ground.

Brattahlíð still has some of the best farmland in Greenland, owing to its location at the inner end of Eriksfjord, which protects it from the cold foggy weather and arctic waters of the outer coast. It has a youth hostel and a small store. More extensive facilities exist in Narsarsuaq across the fjord.

Assembly 
Brattahlíð hosted the first Greenlandic Þing (parliament), based on the Icelandic Althing. Its exact location remains unknown. The exact causes of the disappearance of the Norse settlements toward the end of the 15th century remain unverified, but probably resulted from a combination of the Little Ice Age's cooling temperatures, soil erosion, abandonment by Norway after the Black Plague and political turmoils, more convenient ways for Europeans to procure furs and a mercantile eclipsing by the Hanseatic League, and competition from the Inuit moving southward.

See also 
 Qassiarsuk about the present settlement on the location
 Garðar, a bishopric seat founded in the 12th century close to Brattahlíð

References 

Diamond, Jared, Collapse: How Societies Choose to Fail or Succeed  (New York: Viking, 2005) 
Ingstad, Helge (tr. Naomi Walford), Land under the Pole Star (New York: St. Martin's, 1966)
Jones, Gwyn, The Norse Atlantic Saga (Oxford University Press, 1986)

External links 
"Brattahlid, Norse Greenland", Earth Observatory Picture of the Day (June 2, 2005), NASA.

An Old Captivity (1940) by Nevil Shute is a fictional account of an early aerial investigation of the old Norse settlement at Brattalid and of Leif Ericson's journey to North America in c 1000 AD.

Populated places established in the 10th century
Norse settlements in Greenland
Sources of Norse mythology
Sagas of Icelanders